Maddy Moore (born 17 May 2000) is a Bermudian swimmer. She competed in the women's 50 metre freestyle and women's 50 metre butterfly events at the 2019 World Aquatics Championships held in Gwangju, South Korea. In both events she did not advance to compete in the semi-finals. She also represented Bermuda at the 2022 World Aquatics Championships held in Budapest, Hungary.

In 2018, she competed in the girls' 50 metre backstroke event at the Summer Youth Olympics held in Buenos Aires, Argentina. She did not qualify to compete in the semi-finals. She also competed in the girls' 50 metre butterfly, girls' 50 metre freestyle and girls' 100 metre freestyle events.

She represented Bermuda at the 2022 Commonwealth Games held in Birmingham, England.

References

External links
 

2000 births
Bermudian female freestyle swimmers
Bermudian female swimmers
Commonwealth Games competitors for Bermuda
Competitors at the 2018 Central American and Caribbean Games
Female backstroke swimmers
Female butterfly swimmers
Living people
Pan American Games competitors for Bermuda
Place of birth missing (living people)
Swimmers at the 2018 Summer Youth Olympics
Swimmers at the 2019 Pan American Games
Swimmers at the 2022 Commonwealth Games